Ashlei Sharpe Chestnut is an American actress and writer known for her work on Broadway, film and television.

Early life
Ashlei Sharpe Chestnut was born to Leslie Sharpe Chestnut and Charles S. Chestnut IV and was raised in Charlotte, North Carolina. Chestnut attended Northwest School of the Arts with a major in Theatre and minor in Dance. In 2015, she graduated with a Bachelor of Fine Arts in Acting from The University of North Carolina at Greensboro's School of Music, Theatre and Dance.

Stage credits

Filmography

References

External links

Living people
University of North Carolina at Greensboro alumni
African-American actresses
Actresses from Florida
American film actresses
American stage actresses
American television actresses
21st-century American actresses
21st-century African-American women
21st-century African-American people
Year of birth missing (living people)